Elizabeth Lee Bloomstein (January 8, 1859 – January 2, 1927) was an American history professor, university librarian, clubwoman, and suffragist based in Nashville, Tennessee.

Early life and education
Elizabeth Lee Bloomstein was born in 1859 into a prominent Jewish family in Nashville, Tennessee, the daughter of Jacob and Esther Miriam Bloomstein. She graduated from Ward Seminary before attending George Peabody College for Teachers. She was one of thirteen young women in the first graduation class from Peabody, the class of 1877.  She pursued further studies during summers at other universities and during travel abroad.

Career
Bloomstein served as professor of history at George Peabody College for Teachers. She was a member of the first executive committee of the Tennessee History Teachers' Association, when it was organized in 1912.

Off-campus, she was president of the Magazine Club, a women's literary organization in Nashville. She was also active in the Twentieth Century Club, the Ladies' Hermitage Association, the Women's Association of the University of Nashville, the Tennessee Women's Press Club, the Women's Historical Association, and the Art Association. She was also a member of the Southern Rejection League, a temperance organization, and the Housekeepers' Club, a public hygiene group. She chaired the education committee of the Tennessee Federation of Women's Clubs, and was on the education committee of the National Federation of Women's Clubs. "I believe that the women's club movement is the consciousness of a desire for larger relations of life," she explained. She was also a member of the United Daughters of the Confederacy (UDC).

In 1897, she gave an address, "The Decoration of the Parthenon," at the Tennessee Centennial and International Exposition. During World War I, Bloomstein was a member of Nashville's Women's Committee of the Council of National Defense.

Later life
Elizabeth Lee Bloomstein died in 1927, age 66. Her remains were interred at Temple Cemetery in Nashville.

Today there is a Lizzie Lee Bloomstein Fellowship for graduate students at Vanderbilt University.

References

1859 births
1927 deaths
Jewish American writers
Jewish Confederates
People from Nashville, Tennessee
Vanderbilt University alumni
Vanderbilt University faculty
American women historians
19th-century American historians
20th-century American historians
20th-century American women writers
19th-century American women writers
Members of the United Daughters of the Confederacy